Soni is a very small village in Taluka - Miraj in southern Maharashtra State, India. Farming is the main business in Soni.

From the Maharashtra Gazette 
Village Name: Soni
Direction : N 
Travelling distance: 12.0
Area (Sq: miles.: 7.4
Population:6,255
Households: 1362
Agriculturists: 1213
Post Office: Local
Distance: 0
special: grapes farm

Status of drinking water and sanitation facilities for school 
Name of School: Balwadi No.4
Name of Habitation: Main 
Category of School: Balwadi/Aanganwadi
Classification of School: Government  
Number of Students: 41
Facilities Available: Sanitation (Both)  
Separate Toilets available for    Boys & Girls:     Yes (For Both)  #Separate Urinal Facility    available for Boys & Girls:  Yes (For Both)  
Reasons for Non-availability of Drinking Water Facility: Multiple reasons
Reason for Non availability of Sanitation Facility: NA 
Target for Drinking water: Month:  Mar   Year:  2007
Target for Sanitation: Month:  NA   Year:  NA  
Source of funding (Drinking water facility): ARWSP
Source of funding (Sanitation facility): NA  
 NA : Not Applicable

As per Indian Railways (Central Railways) 
No. Section                                           Year of Completion 
17. Birlanagar-Soni (55.5 km) (Part of Guna-Etawah ) 2000

Villages in Sangli district